The 1983–84 Macedonian Republic League was the 40th since its establishment. FK Bregalnica Shtip won their 4th championship title, after the last one 8 years before back in 1976.

Participating teams

Final table

External links
SportSport.ba
Football Federation of Macedonia 

Macedonian Football League seasons
Yugo
3